Iremel is a compact mountain ridge in the Southern Ural Mountains in the republic of Bashkortostan, Russian Federation (bordering with Chelyabinsk Oblast to the north-west). The highest peak, Bolshoy Iremel (Big Iremel), or simply Iremel, stands at 1589 metres (5200 ft) high. Maly Iremel (Small Iremel), 6 kilometers north-east, stands at 1449 meters. It is the source of the River Belaya.

The highest peak of the South Urals, Mount Yamantaw (1638 meters) is located 53 kilometers south-west from Bolshoy Iremel.

Gallery

References 

Mountains of Bashkortostan
Natural monuments of Russia